Charles Babbage (1791–1871), was an English mathematician, mechanical engineer, and pioneering computer scientist.

Babbage may also refer to:

Science and technology
 Babbage (programming language), a high-level assembly language for the GEC 4000 series minicomputer
 Babbage (crater), a crater on the moon
 Charles Babbage Institute, an information technology research center at the University of Minnesota, US
 Charles Babbage Research Centre, Canada, publisher of the journal Ars Combinatoria

Other uses
 Babbage (surname), a given name and a family name (including a list of persons with the name)
 Babbage's, a video game retailer that eventually became GameStop
 A river in the Arctic Ocean watershed in Yukon, Canada